Guatteria stenopetala is a species of plant in the Annonaceae family. It is endemic to Venezuela.

References

stenopetala
Endemic flora of Venezuela
Vulnerable flora of South America
Taxonomy articles created by Polbot